Lavrio Indoor Hall, or Kleisto Gymnastirio Lavriou (Greek: Κλειστό Γυμναστήριο Λαυρίου), is an indoor sporting arena that is located in the city of Lavrio, Attica, Greece. The seating capacity of the arena for basketball games is 1,700 people. The arena is owned by the municipality of Lavreotiki.

History
The arena has been used as the home arena of the Greek professional basketball team Lavrio, of the Greek Basket League.

References

External links
Lavrio Indoor Hall Interior Image 1
Lavrio Indoor Hall Interior Image 2
Lavrio Indoor Hall Interior Image 3

Basketball venues in Greece
Indoor arenas in Greece
Volleyball venues in Greece